Pheidole epiphyta is a species of ant that was discovered and described by Longino, J. T. in 2009.

References

epiphyta
Insects described in 2009